Valeria (Valería) is a Mexican telenovela produced by Ernesto Alonso for Telesistema Mexicano in 1966. It was directed by Julio Alejandro.

An Argentinian remake of Valería was made in 1986. A Peruvian telenovela Milagros is quite similar to Valería.

Plot 
In this telenovela is shown the First Holy Communion of the main character Valería. On the day of her First Communion, Valería witnessed the murder of her father and rape of her mother.

Cast 
Rosenda Monteros as Valeria
Aldo Monti
Enrique Álvarez Félix

References

External links 

Mexican telenovelas
1966 telenovelas
Televisa telenovelas
Spanish-language telenovelas
1966 Mexican television series debuts
1966 Mexican television series endings